CCGS Moytel is a Canadian Coast Guard air cushioned vehicle or hovercraft and is based at CCG Hovercraft Base Richmond, British Columbia, on Sea Island. The primary mission of Moytel is to provide search and rescue services for British Columbia.

The Canadian Coast Guard describes Moytel as a "more versatile amphibious vehicle capable of patrolling inland waters" as well as being "a larger [and] more powerful vessel than the CCGS Penac, [with] a greater range of capabilities and features, including a bow ramp that will enable it to transport supplies such as rescue equipment and vehicles."

Description
The vessel has a net tonnage of 70 tons and the hull is constructed of aluminum. Moytel is powered by four Caterpillar C32 geared diesel engines rated at  turning two controllable pitch propellers. The vessel is also equipped with bow and stern thrusters. Moytel has a complement of six personnel of which two are officers.

Service history
Moytel was constructed by Griffon Hoverworks Ltd and launched in 2013. The vessel entered service with the Canadian Coast Guard (CCG) in 2014 and registered in Ottawa, Ontario. The ship's name means "to help each other" in Halq'emélem. Moytel is based at CCG Hovercraft Base in Richmond, British Columbia and assigned to the CCG's Western Region.

See also

References

Hovercraft of the Canadian Coast Guard
2013 ships